Julie VanOrden (born in Pocatello, Idaho) is a Republican Idaho State Representative since 2012 representing District 31 in Seat B.

Education
Born Julie Tsukamoto, she attended Blackfoot High School, the College of Southern Idaho, and earned her associate degree from Idaho State University's vocational technical school.

2018 primary election 

On May 15, 2018, Julie VanOrden was defeated by Blackfoot area political activist, home-educator, and stay-at-home mother of 10 children, Julianne Young.  Young campaigned against VanOrden's efforts to update Idaho sex education statue which dated by to the 1970s.

Idaho Public Charter School Commission 

In July, 2018 Rep. VanOrden was appointed by Idaho House Speaker Scott Bedke to serve a four-year term on the Idaho Public Charter School Commission.  The commission oversees the regulation of charter schools in the State of Idaho.

Election history

References

External links
Julie VanOrden at the Idaho Legislature
Campaign site
 

Year of birth missing (living people)
Living people
American politicians of Japanese descent
American women of Japanese descent in politics
Asian-American people in Idaho politics
Idaho State University alumni
Republican Party members of the Idaho House of Representatives
People from Bingham County, Idaho
People from Pocatello, Idaho
Women state legislators in Idaho
College of Southern Idaho alumni
21st-century American politicians
21st-century American women politicians
Asian conservatism in the United States